Indian Telly Award for Best Actor in a Supporting Role – Female is an award given by Indiantelevision.com as part of its annual Indian Telly Awards for TV serials, to recognize a female actor who has delivered an outstanding performance in a Supporting Role.

The award was first awarded in 2004. Since 2010, the award has been separated in two categories, Jury Award and Popular Award. Winner of Jury award is chosen by the jury of critics assigned to the function while Popular Award is given on the basis of public voting.

List of winners (Popular)

2000-2009
2001 Not Awarded
2002 Not Awarded
2003 Not Awarded
2004 Geetanjali Tikekar - Kasautii Zindagii Kay as Aparna Basu
Aruna Irani - Des Mein Niklla Hoga Chand as Teji
Sudha Shivpuri - Kyunki Saas Bhi Kabhi Bahu Thi as Baa
Tina Parekh - Kahaani Ghar Ghar Kii as Shruti 
Poonam Narula - Kkusum as Mahi
2005 Gauri Pradhan Tejwani - Kyunki Saas Bhi Kabhi Bahu Thi as Nandini
Tina Parekh - Kahaani Ghar Ghar Kii as Shruti
Suvarna Jha - Kaisa Ye Pyar Hai as Mishti
Shweta Gulati - Remix as Tia
Mauli Ganguly - Sarrkkar..Risshton Ki Ankahi Kahani as Kritika	
2006 Tina Parekh - Kasautii Zindagii Kay as Mukti
Surveen Chawla - Kahiin To Hoga as Charu
Aruna Irani - Vaidehi – Ek Aur Agni Pareeksha as Sitadevi
Vaishnavi Mahant - Ek Ladki Anjaani Si as Meera Sachdeva
Neena Gupta - Saat Phere as Manno Bhabhi
2007 Lubna Salim - Baa Bahoo Aur Baby as Leela Thakkar
Jaya Bhattacharya - Thodi Si Zameen Thoda Sa Aasmaan as Pooja
Ashlesha Sawant - Saat Phere as Tara
Achint Kaur - Virrudh as Vedika
Rakshanda Khan -  Kyunki Saas Bhi Kabhi Bahu Thi as Tanya Virani
Jennifer Winget - Kasautii Zindagii Kay as Sneha
Arunima Sharma - Kasamh Se as Rano
2008 Smita Bansal - Balika Vadhu as Sumitra
Amrapali Gupta - Teen Bahuraaniyaan as Bindiya
Arunima Sharma - Kasamh Se as Rani
Aditi Sajwan - Jai Shri Krishna as Yashoda
Vibha Chibber - Sapna Babul Ka...Bidaai as Kaushalya Devi
2009 Savita Prabhune - Pavitra Rishta as Sulochana
Vibha Anand - Balika Vadhu as Sugna Shyam Singh.
Smita Bansal - Balika Vadhu as Sumitra 
Lata Sabharwal - Yeh Rishta Kya Kehlata Hai  as Rajshree Maheshwari
Roopa Ganguly - Agle Janam Mohe Bitiya Hi Kijo as Sumitra

2010-present
2010 Supriya Pilgaonkar - Sasural Genda Phool as Shailja Kashyap
Bhairavi Raichura - Balika Vadhu as Bhagwati
Lata Sabharwal - Yeh Rishta Kya Kehlata Hai  as Rajshree Maheshwari
Roopa Ganguly - Agle Janam Mohe Bitiya Hi Kijo as Sumitra 
Vaishali Thakkar - Uttaran as Damini
2011 No Award
2012 Rupal Patel - Saath Nibhana Saathiya as Kokila Parag Modi
Anjum Farooki - Balika Vadhu as Gauri Jagdish Singh
Neelu Vaghela - Diya Aur Baati Hum as Santosh Arun Rathi (Bhabo)
Supriya Pilgaonkar - Sasural Genda Phool as Shailja Kashyap 
Aarti Singh - Parichay - Nayee Zindagi Kay Sapno Ka as Seema Chopra
2013 Pallavi Purohit - Madhubala - Ek Ishq Ek Junoon as Padmini
Neelu Vaghela - Diya Aur Baati Hum as Santosh Arun Rathi (Bhabo) 
Smita Bansal - Balika Vadhu as Sumitra 
Sonali Sachdev - Sanskaar – Dharohar Apno Ki as Parul Karsan Vaishav
Rupal Patel - Saath Nibhana Saathiya as Kokila Parag Modi
2014 Rajshree Thakur - Bharat Ka Veer Putra – Maharana Pratap as Maharani Jaivantabai 
Neelu Vaghela - Diya Aur Baati Hum as Santosh Arun Rathi (Bhabo) 
Vaishali Thakkar - Uttaran as Damini
Shafaq Naaz - Mahabharat as Kunti 
Mihika Verma - Yeh Hai Mohabbatein as Mihika Iyer
2019  Anita Hassanandani - Naagin 3 as Vishakha2021 Erica Fernandes - Kasautii Zindagi KayJigyasa Singh - Shakti - Astitva Ke Ehsaas Ki
Sriti Jha - Kumkum Bhagya
Akriti Sharma - Kulfi Kumar Bajewala

 Jury Award 

2010-present2010 Vaishali Thakkar - Uttaran as Damini2011 No Award2012 Surekha Sikri - Balika Vadhu as Kalyani Devi (Dadisa)Bhairavi Raichura - Balika Vadhu as Bhagwati
Smita Bansal - Balika Vadhu as Sumitra 
Kamya Panjabi - Maryada: Lekin Kab Tak? as Uttara
Supriya Pilgaonkar - Sasural Genda Phool as Shailja Kashyap2013 Neelu Vaghela - Diya Aur Baati Hum as Santosh Arun Rathi (Bhabo)Alka Amin - Parichay - Nayee Zindagi Kay Sapno Ka as Veena Chopra
Zarina Wahab - Gumrah: End of Innocence as Sawant Daggar
Jayati Bhatia - Sasural Simar Ka as Nirmala Devi Bhardwaj
Tarana Raja Kapoor - Bade Achhe Lagte Hain as Neha Vikram Shergill2014 Shabana Azmi - 24 (Indian TV series) as Abhilasha GrewalVaishali Thakkar - Uttaran as Damini
Rajshree Thakur - Bharat Ka Veer Putra – Maharana Pratap as Maharani Jaivantabai 
Vaishnavi Mahant - Sapne Suhane Ladakpan Ke as Shail Dayal Garg 
Shama Deshpande - Madhubala - Ek Ishq Ek Junoon as Radha Kundra2019 Poorva Gokhale - Tujhse Hai Raabta as Anupriya Deshmukh Indian Telly Award for Best Actress in a Supporting Role (Comedy) 

Popular2014 Sapna Sikarwar - F.I.R 
Kanika Maheshwari - Diya Aur Baati Hum as Meenakshi Vikram Rathi
Debina Bonnerjee - Chidiya Ghar as Mayuri 
Sumona Chakravarti - Comedy Nights with Kapil as Manju
Upasana Singh - Comedy Nights with Kapil as Pinky Bua2015 Manasi Parekh - Sumit Sambhal Lega as Maya Walia'''
Sumona Chakravathy - Comedy Nights with Kapil as Manju
Anita Kanwal - Zindagi Abhi Baaki Hai Mere Ghost as Dadi
Bharti Singh - Comedy Nights Bachao
Upasana Singh - Comedy Nights with Kapil as Bua

References

Indian Telly Awards